Lost Brotherhood is the fourth studio album by Canadian musician Lawrence Gowan, originally released in 1990. The album follows a more hard rock oriented sound, with some tracks bearing a resemblance to past material. The album reached multi-platinum status in Canada and spawned the singles, "All the Lovers in the World," "Lost Brotherhood," and "Out of a Deeper Hunger". Alex Lifeson of Rush, Steve Shelski of Coney Hatch, and Ken Greer of Red Rider contributed guitar work for the album.

Track listings

Personnel 
 Lawrence Gowan – lead and backing vocals, keyboards
 John Webster – additional keyboards
 Alex Lifeson – guitar (except on "All The Lovers In The World") 
 Ken Greer – guitar, pedal steel guitar
 Steve Shelski – additional guitars
 Mladon Zarron – additional guitars
 Tony Levin – bass guitar
 Jerry Marotta – drums, backing vocals
 Greg Critchley – drums on "All The Lovers In The World"
 Steve Kendry – additional drums
 Eddie Schwartz – backing vocals
 Terry Gowan – backing vocals

 Gary Kulesha – string arrangements

 Noel Golden – engineer (all tracks); mixing (tracks 5, 7, 8, 9)
 Chris Lord-Alge – mixing (tracks 1, 4)
 Stephen Chase – mixing (tracks 2, 3, 6, 10)

Singles

References

External links

Interview 
 Lost Brotherhood – Behind the Vinyl (interview with boom 97.3)

Albums produced by Mike Howlett
Lawrence Gowan albums
1990 albums
Anthem Records albums
Columbia Records albums
Atlantic Records albums